Cederholm is a Swedish surname. People with this surname include:
 Andreas Cederholm (born 1990), Swedish handballer
 Anton Cederholm (born 1995), Swedish ice hockey defenceman
 Ivar Cederholm (1902–1982), Norwegian tenor
 Jacob Cederholm (born 1998), Swedish ice hockey defenceman
 (born 1963), Danish actor, theatre director, and playwright

See also 
 Ceder